Middle Assendon  is a village in the Stonor valley in the Chiltern Hills. The village has a public house, the Rainbow Inn.

External links

Assendon e-Museum

Villages in Oxfordshire